Right Now! is a studio album by the American noise rock band Pussy Galore, released in 1987 through Caroline Records.

Critical reception
Trouser Press wrote that the album "brings Pussy Galore into the realm of artistic consideration but reveals them as a fairly bad noise band." The Spin Alternative Record Guide called Right Now! the band's "finest bulldozer ride through the album format."

Track listing
All songs written by Jon Spencer except where noted.

Personnel
Adapted from the Right Now! liner notes.

Pussy Galore
 Bob Bert – drums, percussion
 Julie Cafritz – electric guitar, vocals
 Neil Hagerty – electric guitar, vocals
 Jon Spencer – lead vocals, electric guitar

Production and additional personnel
 Chris Gehringer – mastering
 Michael Lavine – photography

Charts

Release history

References

External links 
 

1987 albums
Pussy Galore (band) albums
Caroline Records albums
Matador Records albums
Mute Records albums